John Bernard O'Hara (29 October 1862 - 31 March 1927) was an Australian poet and schoolmaster.

O'Hara was born at Bendigo, Victoria. His father, Patrick Knight O'Hara, a primary school teacher in the education department, Victoria, also published two volumes of verse. O'Hara was educated at Carlton College and Ormond College, University of Melbourne, where he had a distinguished career. After winning various exhibitions he graduated with first-class honours in mathematics and physics in 1885. He was appointed lecturer in mathematics and natural philosophy at Ormond College in 1886, and in 1889 resigned to become headmaster of South Melbourne College. In his hands it became the leading private school in Victoria, and its pupils more than held their own in competition with those from the public schools. During a period of eight years, of 28 first-class honours gained by all the schools of Victoria in physics and chemistry, 14 were obtained by pupils from South Melbourne College. O'Hara was an inspiring teacher, and many of his pupils have since held distinguished positions in the universities of Australia.

O'Hara published his first volume of poems, Songs of the South, in 1891. This was followed by Songs of the South, Second Series, in 1895, Lyrics of Nature (1899), A Book of Sonnets (1902), Odes and Lyrics (1906), Calypso and other Poems (1912), The Poems of John Bernard O'Hara, A Selection (1918), At Eventide (1922), and Sonnets and Rondels (1925). All these volumes were favourably received by the press, and in 1919 a critic in The Times Literary Supplement spoke of O'Hara as a "singer who takes his place in the company of representative English poets". That was going too far. O'Hara wrote a large amount of carefully wrought verse, always readable and often on the verge of poetry. His sonnets are good and his nature poems charming, what he had to say was often beautifully said, but he cannot be given a high place among Australian poets.

In his youth O'Hara was a skillful cricketer and played pennant cricket for many years. As a boy he met Marcus Clarke, and was friendly with William Gay, Brunton Stephens, John Farrell and other literary men of his period. The close attention he had to give to his school kept him out of literary circles for many years. After his retirement in 1917 he did not enter them again, and lived quietly until his death on 31 March 1927. He married Agnes Elizabeth Law of Hamilton, Victoria in 1910 and was survived by her.

External links
 John Bernard O'Hara (1864-1927) Gravesite at Brighton General Cemetery (Vic)

References

1862 births
1927 deaths
Australian poets
Australian educators
People from Bendigo